Andrzej Krzysztof Wróblewski (born as Andrzej Krzysztof Fejgin 2 July 193513 January 2012) was a Polish journalist.

Born into a Jewish family. Wróblewski worked for many years at Polityka, which he left in 1982, and for the Trójka radio station.  After the end of the Martial law in Poland, he was editor of Gazeta Bankowa.  He returned to Polityka in 1996.

Wróblewski retired in 2004.

References

2012 deaths
1935 births
20th-century Polish Jews
20th-century Polish journalists
Journalists from Vilnius
People from Wilno Voivodeship (1926–1939)
Fulbright alumni